This article contains a list of Illinois Institute of Technology student groups. Illinois Institute of Technology (IIT) currently has over a hundred student groups on campus including musical groups, cultural clubs, and academic societies.

Academic societies

STEM organizations

Service organizations

Religious organizations

Arts and media groups

Other clubs

Greek organizations

Notes

External links
 IIT Organizations, official list of current student organizations

Illinois Institute of Technology